Cyberspace is a term for virtual reality coined by William Gibson.

Cyberspace may also refer to:
Cyberspace (album), a 2000 music album by composer Eloy Fritsch
Cyberspace (role-playing game), a cyberpunk role-playing game
"Cyberspace", a song by AC/DC from their album Stiff Upper Lip Tour Edition
"Cyberspace", a song by Battle Beast from their album Steel
Cyberspace 3000, a comic book by Marvel Comics
Cyberspace Command, an alternate name for Air Force Cyber Command, a United States Air Force major command
Cyberspace Electronic Security Act, a bill enacted by the US Congress
Sometimes used to refer to the Internet, World Wide Web or virtual reality in general

See also

Cyberchase, an animated television series
Augmented reality
Virtual reality
Virtual world
Online community
Space (disambiguation)
Cyber (disambiguation)